Zapote the fifth district of the San José canton, in the San José province of Costa Rica. It is one of the administrative units surrounding San José downtown (officially composed of the districts of El Carmen, Merced, Hospital and Catedral). The district is primarily residential, although there are some government buildings, standing out the Presidential House, seat of the government.

Toponymy
Named after the sapote tree and its fruits, which is written zapote in Spanish.

Geography 
Zapote has an area of  km² and an elevation of  metres.

It is located on the east of the canton, lying between Montes de Oca Canton and Curridabat Canton (bordering them to the north and to the east respectively). The district also borders San Francisco district to the south, and Catedral district to the west.

Demographics 

For the 2011 census, Zapote had a population of  inhabitants.

Transportation

Road transportation 
The district is covered by the following road routes:
 National Route 39
 National Route 204
 National Route 215

Locations
Zapote district includes the "barrios" (or neighbourhoods) of Alborada, Calderón Muñoz, Cerrito, Córdoba, Gloria, Jardín, Las Luisas, Mangos, Montealegre, Moreno Cañas, Quesada Durán, San Dimas, San Gerardo (part of it), Trébol, Ujarrás, Vista Hermosa, Yoses Sur and Zapote Centro. The main official building in the area is the Casa Presidencial, the government building for the President of Costa Rica (but not the residence, which would be the private residence of the presidente) and the executive power, established there since 1986.

References

External links
Municipalidad de San José. Distrito Zapote – Website of San Jose Mayor, includes a map of the district and related info.

Districts of San José Province
Populated places in San José Province